Magnolia zamudioi is a species of flowering plant in the family Magnoliaceae. It is endemic to  Mexico, where it is found in the mountains of southern Veracruz and Chiapas.

Description
Magnolia zamudioi is a tree that grows from 15 to 30 meters tall. It has elliptic to lanceolate leaves, 10 – 13 cm long by 3.5 – 5.5 cm wide. It flowers from March to June and fruits from August to December. Flowers have 90 to 100 stamens and 26 – 32 carpels.

The species was classed as Magnolia schiedeana until being recognized as a distinct species. It has a similar leave shape to Magnolia faustinomirandae, but differs in having smaller leaves, and fewer stamens and carpels.

Range and habitat
Magnolia zamudioi is known from two sites, Tecpatán at the western end of the Chiapas Highlands of Chiapas, and in the coastal Sierra de los Tuxtlas in southern Veracruz. In Tecpatán is abundant around the summit of Cerro Mono Pelón, where it grows in tropical rain forest with Geonoma interrupta between 800 and 850 meters elevation, and in oak–Liquidambar styraciflua forest at 800 meters elevation. In the Sierra de los Tuxtlas it has been found at approximately 800 meters elevation along a roadside in Catemaco Municipality, and in Mecayapan along a steep ridge slope of Volcán Santa Marta.

References

zamudioi
Endemic flora of Mexico
Trees of Chiapas
Trees of Veracruz
Flora of Los Tuxtlas
Flora of the Chiapas Highlands
Cloud forest flora of Mexico
Plants described in 2013